Duff's Happy Fun Bake Time is a TV series on Discovery+ that stars Duff Goldman. The show details Duff and his friends exploring the science of different foods.

It debuted on Discovery+ on April 29, 2021.

Plot
In his kitchen/laboratory called Bakersville, Duff Goldman explores the science of the foods that he makes with help from his puppet and robot friends.

The segment "Science Bites" has Duff in his puppet form explaining food science. There is also a globe-trotting segment that showcases the cultural origins of food.

Characters
 Duff Goldman (portrayed by himself) - A pastry chef that runs Bakersville.
 Couscous (performed by Donna Kimball and Kristin Charney) - A robot and Duff's sous-chef who is made of different kitchen tools.
 Dizzy (performed by Dorien Davies) - An elephant-shaped industrial stand mixer. She mostly sticks her mixing "nose" into everything.
 Dragon Oven - A dragon-shaped oven that speaks in roars, smoke, and hiccups.
 Edgar (performed by Kenny Stevenson) - A "crabby" blue crab that hails from Chesapeake Bay.
 S'Later (performed by Victor Yerrid) - A brown three-toed sloth who has a wise personality.
 Proof Box (performed by Amanda Maddock) - A box that takes Duff anywhere in time to learn the history of certain foods.
 Aliens (performed by Donna Kimball and Kristin Charney) - A pair of Aliens that threaten to destroy the planet unless Duff feeds them.
 Geof (portrayed by Geof Manthorne) - Duff's musically-inclined grocer who would sing about the ingredient of the day.

Episodes

Production

Duff Goldman collaborated with The Jim Henson Company to create this show on Discovery+. When Duff Goldman created this show, the inspiration he used to create this show came from the "Imagination Movers".

Reception

References

External links
 Duff's Happy Fun Bake Time at Discovery+
 Duff's Happy Fun Bake Time at Food Network
 Duff's Happy Fun Bake Time at Internet Movie Database

2020s American cooking television series
2021 American television series debuts
American television shows featuring puppetry
Discovery Channel original programming
English-language television shows
Television series by The Jim Henson Company